Jorge Alejandro Muñoz Luna (born 21 December 1961), better known by his nickname Pindinga Muñoz, is a Chilean former professional footballer who played as a winger for clubs in Chile, Spain and the United States.

Club career
Born in Linares, Chile, Muñoz had a prolific career in Chile, where he played for Deportes Linares, San Luis, Huachipato, Universidad Católica, Cobreloa, Santiago Wanderers, Audax Italiano, Provincial Osorno and Deportes Antofagasta.

He is considered an idol of San Luis since he won two titles along with the club and took part of the team on three divisions: Primera (1981), Segunda (1981 and 1982) and Tercera (1992). Along with Patricio Yáñez and Pititore Cabrera, he made up a prolific attacking trident called Las 3 P (The Three P).

He won two titles of Chilean Primera División. In 1997 he won the title along with Universidad Católica, and in 1988 he joined Cobreloa and won the title in the same year.

Abroad, he played for Mallorca in Spain and Jacksonville Cyclones in the United States, where he retired. Over his career, he played alongside great players such as Marcelo Trobbiani, Patricio Yáñez, Pititore Cabrera and Eduardo Gómez.

International career
In 1985, he made four appearances for the Chile national team, scoring a goal in the 1986 FIFA World Cup qualification match versus Paraguay in 17 November.

Personal life
Muñoz is well known by his nickname Pindinga, a derivation of Pitinga, how people from Linares called to a local bird that used to run over the rivers and lakes.

After playing for Jacksonville Cyclones, he made his home in the United States. Since 2009, he has lived in St. Augustine, Florida.

His American-born granddaughter, Isabella, plays football at youth level and desires to play for the United States.

Honours
San Luis
 Segunda División de Chile (1): 1980
 Copa Polla Gol (1): 1980

Universidad Católica
 Chilean Primera División (1): 1987

Cobreloa
 Chilean Primera División (1): 1988

References

External links
 
 Jorge Muñoz at MemoriaWanderers 
 Jorge Muñoz at PlaymakerStats

1961 births
Living people
People from Linares
Chilean footballers
Chilean expatriate footballers
Chile international footballers
Association football forwards
Deportes Linares footballers
San Luis de Quillota footballers
C.D. Huachipato footballers
RCD Mallorca players
Club Deportivo Universidad Católica footballers
Cobreloa footballers
Santiago Wanderers footballers
Audax Italiano footballers
Provincial Osorno footballers
C.D. Antofagasta footballers
Jacksonville Cyclones players
Primera B de Chile players
Chilean Primera División players
Segunda División players
Tercera División de Chile players
A-League (1995–2004) players
Chilean expatriate sportspeople in Spain
Chilean expatriate sportspeople in the United States
Expatriate footballers in Spain
Expatriate soccer players in the United States
Chilean expatriates in the United States